Madeleine Sims-Fewer is a British-Canadian independent filmmaker and actress.

Personal life
Sims-Fewer was born in Kawartha Lakes, Ontario, Canada. Her family moved to  Bath,  England when she was two years old. Sims-Fewer studied filmmaking at York University in Toronto. She returned to England to study acting at the Drama Centre London.

Career

Acting roles
Sims-Fewer made her film acting debut in 2007 in the short The Adventures of Ratman. After several shorts, Sims-Fewer made her feature film debut in Operation Avalanche in 2016.

Mancinelli and Sims-Fewer collaborations
In 2015, Sims-Fewer met Dusty Mancinelli at the 2015 TIFF Talent Lab. Since 2017, the pair has co-directed several short films in their DM Films joint venture. Their films have been shown at TIFF, BFI London Film Festival, Vancouver International Film Festival, the Moscow International Film Festival and the Slamdance Film Festival, among others. Their first collaboration, Slap Happy, about a tempestuous relationship, was an official selection at the BFI London Film Festival, Vancouver and Slamdance. Reviewer Ben Robins named it one of the best short films at the BFI Festival, describing it as "like a little less touched-up Blue Valentine, with a much more twisted sense of humour." Their second collaboration was Woman in Stall, a "claustrophobic thriller" about an encounter in a public restroom between a man and a woman trapped in a cubicle. It won the Short Film Grand Jury Prize at the Slamdance festival. Chubby, their third collaboration, was shown at the 2019 Telluride festival. A study of a 10-year-old's experience with sexual abuse, it was described as "harrowing" and would "stay with you long after its credits roll".

Violation

A teaser of their debut feature Violation was shown at the Cannes Marché du Film Online in June 2020. Violation, which is described as "decidedly dark, potentially dangerous and probably deranged" and "flips the revenge genre on its head", was selected for the "Fantastic 7" genre festival initiative to highlight genre films at seven international film festivals. Violation premiered at the 2020 Toronto International Film Festival in the "Midnight Madness" program. Critic Mike Crisolago has named it one of 30 films he is already "excited to see.". Now Toronto critic Norman Wilner called it "a major levelling up of their signature combination of rage and intensity". According to Variety reviewer Tomris Laffley, "Despite some heavy-handed choices, Madeleine Sims-Fewer and Dusty Mancinelli pack a profound gut-punch with their debut feature."

Sims-Fewer won two Vancouver Film Critics Circle Awards for Best Actress and Best Film. She also received two Canadian Screen Award nominations at the 9th Canadian Screen Awards in 2021, for Best Actress and the John Dunning Best First Feature Award.

Filmography

References

External links
 
 dmfilms.com official website

Canadian film actresses
Canadian women film directors
Year of birth missing (living people)
Film directors from Ontario
Actresses from Ontario
People from Kawartha Lakes
Living people